The Flower Lane is the fourth studio album by the American indie rock project Ducktails, released on January 28, 2013 on Domino. Co-produced by Matt Mondanile and Al Carlson, The Flower Lane was the first Ducktails album to be recorded in a full studio environment.

The album's overall aesthetic resembles a full band recording, and features contributions from Big Troubles, Joel Ford, Daniel Lopatin, Sam Mehran, Martin Courtney and Madeline Follin.

Background and recording
The album was recorded in 2012 at Gary's Electric Studio, in Brooklyn, New York. Regarding the recording location, primary recording artist Matt Mondanile noted: "I loved recording at Gary’s Electric Studio because it’s like four or five blocks from my house, so every day I’d get out of bed and spend about twelve hours there. I’ve always wanted to do a record like that."

Unlike Mondanile's previous Ducktails releases, the album featured collaborations from other artists: "People would just walk into the studio and see how they could change the record. I’d spent so much time recording by myself, so I thought this would be something different.”

Reception

In a mostly positive for Pitchfork, Steven Hyden praised the album's production and collaborative nature the recording process: "The Flower Lane is the latest progression for what now resembles a fully fledged group. Mondanile's hasn't tempered the echoes of his other band in Ducktails, but he isn't confined to Real Estate's shadow, either."

Track listing

Personnel

Musicians
Matt Mondanile – vocals, guitar, keyboards, drum machine, synth, percussion
Ian Drennan – electric piano, synth, keyboards, saxophone, backing vocals
Luka Usmiani – bass guitar
Alex Craig – guitar, backing vocals
Sam Franklin – drums, backing vocals, synth
Joel Ford – bass, backing vocals
Daniel Lopatin – synth
Sam Mehran – guitar
Martin Courtney – piano
Madeline Follin – vocals (7)
Jessa Farkas – vocals (9)
Al Carlson – flute

Recording personnel
Matt Mondanile – producer
Al Carlson – producer, engineer, mixing

References

2013 albums
Ducktails (band) albums
Domino Recording Company albums